Kwenda Mission High School is an 'O' and 'A' Level boarding school in Mashonaland East Province in Zimbabwe.

The school is situated about 150 km south of the capital city Harare. Located in the Chikomba Area, Kwenda Mission High School offers "O" and "A" Level education for both girls and boys. The mission was opened in 1892 by Methodist (Wesley) Missionaries.  Mr Manhera is the current headmaster and Rev Dr Muwanzi is the current principal as well as chief administrator of the institution.

It is one of the seven mission schools run by the Methodist Church in Zimbabwe. Its sister schools are Waddilove High School in Marondera, Chemhanza High School in Wedza, Tekwane Mission in Matebeleland, which was among the first mission stations opened by the missionaries in the 19th century, Sandringham High School in Norton, Pakame High School in Shurugwi and Moleli High School in Makwiro.

References

Boarding schools in Zimbabwe
Educational institutions with year of establishment missing
Education in Mashonaland East Province